Ashley Houts (born December 31, 1987) is an American professional basketball player most recently with the Washington Mystics of the WNBA.

High school career
Ashley Houts attended Dade County High School where she played basketball.

During her attendance she was elected to play the McDonald's and WBCA High School All-American games and was also named second-team All-American by Parade and Sixth-team by Street & Smith's.

She is a two-time All-American honoree who led the Georgia Metros to the 2005 national title in Orlando as well as the U.S. Junior Nationals in Washington, D.C.

As a senior, she was named Homecoming Queen and made Miss Dade County High as a senior.

Following her graduation in 2006 her "23" jersey was retired by Dade County.

College career
Houts played at the University of Georgia from 2006 to 2010.

Georgia statistics

Source

USA Basketball
Houts played on the 2007 FIBA U21 World Championship Team and U.S. National Team at the 2009 World University Games winning two gold medals.

WNBA career
Houts was chosen by the New York Liberty in the second round of the 2010 WNBA Draft. Shortly thereafter she was traded to the Washington Mystics for Nikki Blue.

Personal life
Houts is the daughter of Greg and Joni Houts. Her sister, Emily Houts, played collegiately at Gadsden State Community College and Chattanooga. Her brother, Andrew Houts, was a second-team All-State honoree as a junior and a first-team All-State honoree as a senior at Dade County.

References

External links
 Official Home of UGA Athletics

1987 births
Living people
American women's basketball players
Basketball players from Georgia (U.S. state)
Georgia Lady Bulldogs basketball players
Guards (basketball)
McDonald's High School All-Americans
Parade High School All-Americans (girls' basketball)
People from Dade County, Georgia
Washington Mystics players
Universiade medalists in basketball
Universiade gold medalists for the United States
Medalists at the 2009 Summer Universiade
United States women's national basketball team players